Azza Ali Al-Qasmi (born 12 February 1985) is a Bahraini sport shooter. She was the flag bearer for Bahrain and part of the Bahraini Olympic team at the 2012 Summer Olympics.

Olympic career
She competed in the women's 50 metre rifle three positions at the London Olympics. She did not advance further into the event but had scored a new Arab shooting record, having achieved a score of 576 points, including 21 inner-tens, across the three positions.  She ranked 33rd overall.

Personal life
Azza was born in the town of Riffa, in the Kingdom of Bahrain. She is bilingual in English and Arabic.

References

Bahraini female sport shooters
Living people
Shooters at the 2012 Summer Olympics
Olympic shooters of Bahrain
Shooters at the 2010 Asian Games
Shooters at the 2014 Asian Games
1985 births
Asian Games competitors for Bahrain